= GLULP4 =

Pseudogene in the species Homo sapiens

Identifiers
- Aliases: GLULP4, GLULP, glutamate-ammonia ligase (glutamine synthetase) pseudogene 4, glutamate-ammonia ligase pseudogene 4
- External IDs: GeneCards: GLULP4; OMA:GLULP4 - orthologs

Gene location (Human)
Chr.	Chromosome 9 (human)
Band	9p13.3	Start	34,917,175 bp
Band	9p13.3	End	34,918,296 bp
RNA expression pattern
Bgee	Human / Mouse (ortholog); Top expressed in: Skeletal muscle tissue of biceps brachii; right ventricle; postcentral gyrus; Skeletal muscle tissue of rectus abdominis; decidua; entorhinal cortex; cardia; subthalamic nucleus; Brodmann area 46; pons / n/a; More reference expression data
BioGPS	n/a
Orthologs
Species	Human	Mouse
Entrez	392305	n/a
Ensembl	ENSG00000178723	n/a
UniProt	n a	n/a
RefSeq (mRNA)	n/a	n/a
RefSeq (protein)	n/a	n/a
Location (UCSC)	Chr 9: 34.92 – 34.92 Mb	n/a
PubMed search		n/a
- Wikidata
View/Edit Human

Glutamate-ammonia ligase (glutamine synthetase) pseudogene 4 is a protein that in humans is encoded by the GLULP4 pseudogene.
